The United States Tax Reduction Act of 1975 provided a 10-percent rebate on 1974 tax liability ($200 cap). It created a temporary $30 general tax credit for each taxpayer and dependent.

The investment tax credit was temporarily increased to 10 percent through 1976.

The minimum standard deduction was temporarily increased to $1,900 (joint returns) for one year.

For one year, the percentage standard deduction was increased to 16 percent of adjusted gross income, up to $2,600 if married filing jointly, $2,300 if single, or $1,300 if married filing separately.

The bill became public law 94–12 when it was signed by President Gerald Ford on March 29, 1975.

External links
 

United States federal taxation legislation
1975 in law